Robert Charles Louis Lucas (5 October 1922 – 13 December 2019) was a French field hockey player who competed in the 1948 Summer Olympics and in the 1952 Summer Olympics. Lucas was born in Cambrai in October 1922 and died in Soorts-Hossegor in December 2019 at the age of 97.

References

External links
 

1922 births
2019 deaths
Field hockey players at the 1948 Summer Olympics
Field hockey players at the 1952 Summer Olympics
French male field hockey players
Olympic field hockey players of France